The 1961 Iowa State Cyclones football team represented Iowa State University in the Big Eight Conference during the 1961 NCAA University Division football season. In their fourth year under head coach Clay Stapleton, the Cyclones compiled a 5–5 record (3–4 against conference opponents), finished in fifth place in the conference, and outscored their opponents by a combined total of 151 to 133. They played their home games at Clyde Williams Field in Ames, Iowa.

The regular starting lineup on offense consisted of left end  Larry Montre, left tackle Tom Graham, left guard Carl Proto, center Jon Spelman, right guard Dan Celoni, right tackle Dick Walton, right end Steve Sturek, quarterback Paul Sullivan, left halfback Dave Hoppmann, right halfback J.W. Burden, and fullback Dave Clayberg. John Cooper was the team captain.

The team's statistical leaders included Dave Hoppmann with 920 rushing yards, 718 passing yards, and 30 points (five touchdowns), and Dick Limerick with 402 receiving yards. Two Iowa State players were selected as first-team all-conference players: right guard Dan Celoni and left halfback Dave Hoppmann.

Schedule

References

Iowa State
Iowa State Cyclones football seasons
Iowa State Cyclones football